Guillaume Brisebois (born July 21, 1997) is a Canadian professional ice hockey defenceman. He currently plays with the  Vancouver Canucks of the National Hockey League (NHL).

Playing career

Junior
Brisebois was selected by the Acadie–Bathurst Titan in the 1st round (5th overall) in the 2013 QMJHL draft. Though the team placed last in 2015, he earned praise for his defensive play. After playing for three years, he requested a trade and was subsequently dealt during the 2016 QMJHL draft to the Charlottetown Islanders, along with defenceman Jake Barter, in exchange for Luc Deschenes, a second-round pick in 2017 and a first-round pick in 2018.

Two months after arriving in PEI, his teammates voted him captain. Brisebois recorded his first goal as an Islander in his first game.

Professional
The Vancouver Canucks drafted Brisebois 66th overall after acquiring the pick from the Carolina Hurricanes in exchange for goaltender Eddie Lack. In December 2015, he signed a three-year, entry-level contract with the Canucks. Beginning in 2017, Brisebois regularly played for the Canucks AHL affiliate Utica Comets and later Abbotsford Canucks.

On February 14, 2019 Brisebois made his NHL debut with the Canucks in a 4–3 shootout win against the Los Angeles Kings.

On October 30, 2020, Brisebois re-signed with Vancouver on a one-year, $700,000 contract. In March 2023, after appearing in nine games with the team, Brisebois signed a two-year extension with the Canucks.

Personal life
He is the younger brother of Mathieu Brisebois, who also plays defense professionally for the Nottingham Panthers in the Elite Ice Hockey League.

Career statistics

Regular season and playoffs

International

References

External links

1997 births
Living people
Acadie–Bathurst Titan players
Canadian ice hockey defencemen
Charlottetown Islanders players
Ice hockey people from Quebec
Laval Rocket players
Sportspeople from Longueuil
Utica Comets players
Vancouver Canucks draft picks
Vancouver Canucks players